Voices in Your Head is a student-run a cappella group from the University of Chicago who aim to "push the bounds of contemporary a cappella." Founded in 1998, the group has consisted of both undergraduate and graduate students whose studies range from Economics to Music to MD/PhD programs. Its unique repertoire includes original pieces, as well as an eclectic mix of pop, R&B, rock, and alternative music. Voices competes regularly in the International Championship of Collegiate A Cappella (ICCA) and releases studio recordings of their arrangements.

History

1998—2008 
Voices in Your Head was formed in the fall of 1998 by members who realized there were no 'funky' performance organizations at the University of Chicago. They released their first live album, Sesquipedalia, in 2000, their first studio album, On Point, in 2002, and their second studio album, Songs for Padded Rooms, in 2005.

2008—2014 
Note To Self, their third studio album which was released on May 23, 2008, received a strong Recorded A Cappella Review Board review and contained a track ("Magic") selected for the 2008 edition of the international a cappella compilation, Voices Only.  Noted author Nick Hornby also included "Magic" from Note To Self in his 2008 playlist for the New York Times.

On February 17, 2009, Ben Folds announced that "Magic" would appear on his 2009 album Ben Folds Presents: University A Cappella!, calling it "a hell of a cool place to live for three and a half minutes." NBC Washington commented on the group's contribution, "Magic," saying "the arrangement is so different from the original that the song is a completely unique artifact–which should be the goal of any group, a cappella or otherwise, when attempting a cover." In an interview with Entertainment Weekly, Ben Folds commented: "There’s a group from the University of Chicago called Voices in Your Head that sings 'Magic' on the record, and to me they’re in a different league from the rest of the groups." As part of the tour to support the album release, Voices in Your Head performed live with Ben Folds on March 19, 2009 in Milwaukee, WI at the Eagles Ballroom.

That same year, Voices competed for the first time in the International Championship of Collegiate A Cappella for the first time. In 2011, Voices finished third at their Midwest Quarterfinal; in 2012, they came in first at both the Quarterfinal and the Semifinal, progressing to ICCA finals in New York City, where they finished fourth overall. In addition, they competed in the inaugural Boston Sings collegiate competition, where they placed first.

The group's next album, I Used to Live Alone, was released on May 21, 2011, and marked Voices' emergence into the national a cappella scene. Several tracks met critical acclaim in the a cappella community up to a year before its release: the tracks "I'd Like To," "Boomerang," and "Sharp" were all selected for national a cappella compilation albums. "Boomerang" also won “Best Scholastic Original” in the 2011 CARA (Contemporary A Cappella Recording Awards). The album received positive reviews from the Recorded A Cappella Review Board (RARB), and was selected as one of RARB's picks of the year. In 2012, "I Used To Live Alone" was nominated for five CARAs, winning Best Mixed Collegiate Arrangement (Chris Rishel, for "I'd Like To") and runner up places for Best Mixed Collegiate Album, Song, and Solo.

2014—2020 
Voices returned to ICCA competition in 2014, falling short at the Midwest Semifinal after placing second at the Quarterfinal stage. The next year, however, after finishing first at their Midwest Quarterfinal and Semifinal, the group returned to Finals. The 2015 ICCA Finals, held on April 18 at New York City's Beacon Theatre, saw Voices finish 2nd to the University of Southern California's SoCal VoCals, as well as win Outstanding Soloist at Finals (Shubha Vedula).

The group took 2016 to tour in California and on the East Coast, where they performed for President Barack Obama and First Lady Michelle Obama at a White House holiday party. 2016 also saw the group complete LIGHTS, its sixth studio album, which was released in July of that year. LIGHTS would go on to win CARAs for Best Mixed Collegiate Album and Best Collegiate Original Song (Shubha Vedula and Chris Rishel, for "Feel So Bad").

Voices competed in ICCA again in 2017, this time in the Great Lakes region. After placing first at their Quarterfinal and Semifinal, the group again advanced to Finals. At the Beacon Theatre, Voices finished 2nd to the Northeastern University Nor'easters on April 22, 2017, and won the award for Outstanding Arrangement for “How Deep is Your Love” (Will Cabaniss).

2018 marked the 20th Anniversary of the founding of Voices in Your Head. To celebrate, they competed in ICCA with an entirely original set, being the first group to ever do so. The group advanced to Finals once again, placing first and winning Outstanding Arrangement at both their Quarterfinal and their Semifinal. Voices placed 3rd at Finals, behind The SoCal VoCals of University of Southern California and Upper Structure of Berklee College of Music. The final event of the year, their 20th Anniversary Concert, reunited all alumni to celebrate the group's growth.

Voices released their seventh studio album Begin Again in 2019, which featured their 2017 and 2018 ICCA sets. Begin Again was selected as RARB’s Album of the Year in 2019 and Album of the Decade in 2020, with "Between Us" being selected as the 2019 Track of the Year. Begin Again also went on to win 6 CARAs, while songs "Between Us,” "How Long,” and “Part of Me” were featured on Voices Only 2019, BOCA (Best of College A Cappella) 2019, and Voices Only 2020, respectively. It received a perfect score of 5 in its RARB review, and was called “one of the most original a cappella recordings of the past decade.”

Wanting to explore different creative avenues for a cappella sets, the group took to the National A Cappella Convention (NACC) stage for the first time in 2019, placing as a runner-up behind The Nor’easters of Northeastern University and alongside the Green Tones of the University of North Texas. They also won an award for Outstanding Scene Painting. 

Voices returned to ICCA in 2020, placing second at the Great Lakes Quarterfinal and taking home awards for Outstanding Arrangement, Outstanding Choreography (Natalia Rodriguez), and Outstanding Soloist (Hillary Yuen). Sadly, the competition was canceled due to the COVID-19 pandemic before the group could advance to the Great Lakes Semifinal. In the face of ICCA being canceled, Voices organized “The Remedy Project”, welcoming all ICCA and ICHSA competitors to lend their voices to create an international a cappella collaboration. The project, an asynchronous rendition of “Remedy,” originally performed by Son Lux, received over 168 submissions and showcased the love competitors hold for each other and the music they create.

2021—Present 
In 2021, Voices welcomed 9 new members and set out to compete in ICCA, despite the fact that the majority of the group had never sung with each other in-person before. After placing second at their Quarterfinal and third at their Semifinal, the group won the Wildcard round and advanced to Finals at the Town Hall in New York City for the fifth time in the group's history. This same year, their newly-released single “Wolves” won 3 CARAs and was featured on BOCA 2022. “My Day Will Come”, released shortly after, was featured on Voices Only 2022, BOCA 2023, and selected as RARB's Single of the Year.

Awards

References

External links
 Official Website

University of Chicago
Collegiate a cappella groups
Musical groups from Illinois
Musical groups established in 1998